Serbian singer Milica Pavlović has released four studio albums. She debuted with her song "Tango", which was released in June 2012 after she had appeared on the televised singing show Zvezde Granda. Her debut album Govor tela was released in June 2014 under Grand Production and was sold in 60,000 copies. It was followed by Boginja (2016) and Zauvek (2018). In April 2022, Pavlović independently released her fourth album Posesivna under newly established label  Senorita Music.

Albums

Studio albums

Compilation albums

Singles

As lead artist

Promotional singles

Other charted songs

Guest appearances

Music videos

References

Discographies of Serbian artists
Pop music discographies